Casacalenda (Molisan dialect Casechelenne; Kalena) is a comune (municipality) in the Province of Campobasso in the Italian region Molise, located about  northeast of Campobasso.

The Greek historian Polybius mentions a battle in 217 BC between the Roman army, based in Kalene, and Hannibal, based in Gerione (now a hamlet of Casacalenda). The name might have been derived from the Latin Kalendae or Kalends, the first day of the month in the Roman calendar.

Among its churches is Santa Maria Maggiore.

Casacalenda borders the following municipalities: Bonefro, Guardialfiera, Larino, Lupara, Montorio nei Frentani, Morrone del Sannio, Provvidenti, Ripabottoni.

Emigration 

Since the end of World War II until the 1970s, the town's population declined considerably due to emigration. The places of choice for these emigrants were the Canadian cities of Hamilton, Montreal and Toronto. Montreal even has its own Casacalenda Association. Duncan, British Columbia also has a sizeable community per its population.

Cleveland, Ohio and East Greenwich, Rhode Island also have a large population of citizens from Casacalenda. Buenos Aires, Argentina is the other destination where Casacalenda population emigrated.

Transportation 
Casacalenda is served by a railway station, the Casacalenda-Guardalfiera railway station, on the Termoli-Campobasso and Termoli–Venafro line.

References

External links
 Italy Revisited (photo archives)

Cities and towns in Molise